Norddeich Mole is a railway station located in Norddeich, Lower Saxony, Germany. The station is located on the Emsland Railway. The train services are operated by Deutsche Bahn.

Norddeich Mole is a port for combined passenger and car ferries to the islands of Norderney and Juist, both very popular among holidaymakers, many of whom arrive by train (especially during the summer).

Train services
The station is serves by the following service(s):

Intercity services (IC ): Norddeich - Emden - Münster - Düsseldorf - Köln - Bonn - Koblenz - Mainz - Mannheim - Stuttgart
Intercity services (IC ): Norddeich - Emden - Münster - Düsseldorf - Köln - Bonn - Koblenz - Mainz - Mannheim - Karlsruhe - Konstanz
Intercity services (IC ): Norddeich - Emden - Bremen - Hannover - Braunschweig - Magdeburg - Leipzig
Regional services : Norddeich - Emden - Leer - Oldenburg - Bremen - Nienburg - Hannover

From summer 2020, there will be a connection with ICE-trains to Munich.

References

Railway stations in Lower Saxony
Railway stations serving harbours and ports